"Thunder Kiss '65" is a song by American heavy metal band White Zombie, released in 1992 from the band's third studio album, La Sexorcisto: Devil Music Volume One (1992). The song was released as a single and was later included on compilations, such as Rob Zombie's Past, Present & Future (2003) and The Best of Rob Zombie (2006). 

Actor lines are heard from the 1965 exploitation film Faster, Pussycat! Kill! Kill! and are included in the song the lines read, "You're all shook up, aren't you baby?" and "I never try anything; I just do it. Wanna try me?".

Reception
The single was released three times as a single before it gained the attention of Mike Judge and its video was aired on Beavis and Butt-head in 1993. The popularity of the single resulted in White Zombie's first Grammy nomination for Best Metal Performance later that year. In May 2006, the song was ranked number 32 on VH1's list, '40 Greatest Metal Songs'.

A mix of the song was used by Extreme Championship Wrestling for their weekend syndicated show from 1994–1997.

The song was used in the 2007 movie, Wild Hogs, starring Tim Allen, John Travolta, Martin Lawrence, and William H. Macy.

The song was used to introduce Puck in the original broadcast of the 1994 season of The Real World: San Francisco.

Music video
The song's music video gained significant airplay on MTV. This helped greatly to increase the band's popularity especially after having been played during the MTV animated series Beavis and Butthead on the episode "Yogurt's Cool". The video was directed by Juliet Cuming and features the band playing the song out in a desert with dancers and monsters. According to Rob, it is the lowest budgeted music video released by the band.

Releases
First single track listing (1992)
 "Thunder Kiss '65 (LP version)" – 3:54
 "Welcome to Planet Motherfucker/Psychoholic Slag (LP version)" – 6:21

Second single track listing (1993)
 "Thunder Kiss '65 (Finger on the Trigger remix)" – 6:19
 "Welcome to Planet Motherfucker/Psychoholic Slag (LP version)" – 6:21
 "Black Sunshine (Indestructible "Sock It to Me" Psycho-Head mix)" – 4:58
 "Thunder Kiss '65 (The Diabolical Ramrodder remix)" – 6:17

Charts

Notes

White Zombie (band) songs
1992 debut singles
1992 songs
Songs written by Rob Zombie
Geffen Records singles